Lionel Roberts Stadium is a multi-use stadium in Charlotte Amalie, United States Virgin Islands.  It is currently used mostly for soccer matches, as well as baseball and American football.  The stadium holds 9,000.

References

Soccer venues in the United States Virgin Islands
United States Virgin Islands
Baseball venues in the United States Virgin Islands
Charlotte Amalie, U.S. Virgin Islands